The Greenville station, also known as Katy Depot, is a train depot constructed in 1896 in Greenville, Texas. It was operated by the Missouri, Kansas and Texas Railway Company.  It was registered in the United States National Register of Historic Places on January 25, 1997.

The building foundation is made of limestone, and its walls are built of red brick with cut sandstone wainscoting.

The train depot is also home to the Greenville Railroad Museum.

President Harry Truman stopped at the station in 1948 during his “whistle stop” campaign tour.

See also

National Register of Historic Places listings in Hunt County, Texas

References

C. W. Gasaway, “Interstate Commerce Commission Bureau of Valuation Report, M. K. T. Ry.,” Form #68R, April 3, 1920, pp. 80–95.
W. Walworth Harrison, History of Greenville and Hunt County, Texas, (Waco: Texian Press, 1976), p. 219.
Greenville Herald Banner, September 26, 1988, p. AA3.
http://www.greenville-texas.com/Katy%20Depot%20National%20Register%20Narrative.pdf.

External links

Former Missouri–Kansas–Texas Railroad stations
Railway stations on the National Register of Historic Places in Texas
Railway stations in the United States opened in 1896
Transportation in Hunt County, Texas
Victorian architecture in Texas
National Register of Historic Places in Hunt County, Texas
Former railway stations in Texas